Bangelzehi (also Romanized as Bangelzehī; also known as Bagol Zā’ī and Bangolzī) is a village in Polan Rural District, Polan District, Chabahar County, Sistan and Baluchestan Province, Iran. At the 2006 census, its population was 293, in 54 families.

References 

Populated places in Chabahar County